LHS 1815b (also TOI 704) is a thick disk exoplanet, discovered in 2020 by TESS. 
The planet is located outside the galactic plane.

References 

Exoplanets discovered in 2020
Pictor (constellation)